These are the results of the Girls' K1 Sprint at the 2010 Summer Youth Olympics. It took place at the Marina Reservoir. Time Trial Round was on August 21, 2010. First elimination round, repechage and third round took place on August 21, and quarterfinals, semifinals and medals rounds were on August 22.

Medalists

Time Trial

First round
The winners advanced to the 3rd round. Losers raced at the repechages.

Match 1

Match 2

Match 3

Match 4

Match 5

Match 6

Match 7

Match 8

Match 9

Match 10

Repechage
The fastest 6 boats advanced to the 3rd round.

Repechage 1

Repechage 2

Repechage 3

Repechage 4

Repechage 5

Third round
The winners advanced to the quarterfinals.

Match 1

Match 2

Match 3

Match 4

Match 5

Match 6

Match 7

Match 8

Quarterfinals
The winners advanced to the semifinals.

Match 1

Match 2

Match 3

Match 4

Semifinals
The winners advanced to the finals, losers advanced to the bronze medal match.

Match 1

Match 2

Finals

Gold Medal Match

Bronze Medal Match

References
Time Trial
First Round
Repechage
Third Round
Quarterfinals
Semifinals
Finals

Canoeing at the 2010 Summer Youth Olympics